The following is a list of currently operating hospitals in Wales.  They are sorted by governing body.

Aneurin Bevan University Health Board
Headquarters: Llanfrechfa Grange Hospital, Cwmbran
Chepstow Community Hospital, Chepstow
County Hospital, Pontypool
Grange University Hospital (partially opened), Cwmbran
Llanfrechfa Grange Hospital, Cwmbran
Maindiff Court Hospital, Abergavenny
Monnow Vale Integrated Health and Social Care Facility, Monmouth
Nevill Hall Hospital, Abergavenny
Redwood Memorial Hospital
Royal Gwent Hospital, Newport
St Cadoc's Hospital, Caerleon, Newport
St Woolos Hospital, Newport
Ysbyty Aneurin Bevan, Ebbw Vale
Ysbyty'r Tri Chwm, Ebbw Vale, Blaenau Gwent
Ysbyty Ystrad Fawr, Ystrad Mynach

Betsi Cadwaladr University Health Board
Headquarters: Ysbyty Gwynedd, Bangor
Abergele Hospital, Abergele
Bryn Beryl Hospital, Pwllheli
Bryn y Neuadd Hospital, Llanfairfechan
Cefni Hospital, Llangefni
Chirk Community Hospital, Chirk
Colwyn Bay Community Hospital, Colwyn Bay
Deeside Community Hospital, Deeside
Denbigh Community Hospital, Denbigh
Dolgellau and Barmouth Hospital, Dolgellau
Ffestiniog Memorial Hospital
Glan Clwyd Hospital, Bodelwyddan
Holywell Community Hospital, Holywell
Llandudno General Hospital, Llandudno
Mold Community Hospital, Mold
Royal Alexandra Hospital, Rhyl
Ruthin Community Hospital, Ruthin
Tywyn Hospital, Tywyn
Wrexham Maelor Hospital, Wrexham
Ysbyty Alltwen, Tremadog
Ysbyty Eryri, Caernarfon
Ysbyty Gwynedd, Bangor
Ysbyty Penrhos Stanley, Holyhead

Cardiff and Vale University Health Board
Headquarters: University Hospital of Wales, Cardiff
Barry Hospital, Barry, Vale of Glamorgan
Cardiff Royal Infirmary, Roath, Cardiff
Noah's Ark Children's Hospital for Wales, Heath
Rookwood Hospital
St David's Hospital, Canton, Cardiff
University Hospital Llandough, Llandough, Vale of Glamorgan
University Hospital of Wales, Heath (also known as Heath Hospital)

Cwm Taf Morgannwg University Health Board
Headquarters: Dewi Sant Hospital, Pontypridd
Dewi Sant Hospital, Pontypridd
Cynon Valley Hospital, Mountain Ash
Ysbyty Cwm Rhondda, Llwynypia
Ysbyty George Thomas, Treorchy
Glanrhyd Hospital, Bridgend
Maesteg Community Hospital, Bridgend
Pontypridd Cottage Hospital, Pontypridd
Prince Charles Hospital, Merthyr Tydfil
Princess of Wales Hospital, Bridgend
Royal Glamorgan Hospital, Llantrisant

Hywel Dda University Health BoardHeadquarters: Merlin's Court, Haverfordwest
Aberaeron Hospital, Aberaeron
Amman Valley Hospital, Ammanford
Bronglais Hospital, Aberystwyth
Cardigan and District Community Hospital, Cardigan
Glangwili General Hospital, Carmarthen
Llandovery Hospital, Llandovery
Prince Philip Hospital, Llanelli
South Pembrokeshire Hospital, Pembroke Dock
St David's Hospital, Carmarthen (Cwm Seren, Tudor House and Ty Bryn)
Tenby Cottage Hospital, Tenby
Tregaron Hospital, Tregaron
Withybush General Hospital, Haverfordwest

Powys Teaching Local Health Board
Headquarters: Mansion House, Bronllys
Brecon War Memorial Hospital, Brecon
Bronllys Hospital, Bronllys
Knighton Hospital, Knighton
Llandrindod Wells County War Memorial Hospital, Llandrindod Wells
Llanidloes War Memorial Hospital, Llanidloes
Machynlleth Community Hospital, Machynlleth
Montgomery County Infirmary, Newtown
Victoria Memorial Hospital, Welshpool
Ystradgynlais Community Hospital, Ystradgynlais

Swansea Bay University Health Board
Headquarters: Baglan Bay, Port Talbot 
Cefn Coed Hospital, Cockett, Swansea
Gorseinon Hospital, Gorseinon
Morriston Hospital, Morriston
Neath Port Talbot Hospital, Port Talbot
Singleton Hospital, Swansea
Tonna Hospital, Neath

Velindre NHS Trust
Headquarters: Charnwood Court, Parc Nantgarw, Cardiff
Velindre Cancer Centre, Whitchurch, Cardiff

Other divisions of the trust provide national services such as breast test screening, cervical cancer screening, IT, and the national blood service.

Military hospitals
203 (Welsh) Field Hospital

Welsh Ambulance Services NHS Trust
Headquarters: H.M. Stanley Hospital, St Asaph

The Welsh Ambulance Services NHS Trust manages all ambulance services within Wales.

References
Directory of NHS Wales services

Wales
 List
 List
Hospitals